Another Phase is Maria Mena's debut album, which was released by Sony Music Norway. It reached #6 on the Norwegian charts. Her two singles "Free" and "My Lullaby" first appeared on this album.
The album was co-written and produced by Arvid Solvang.

The original 2002 release was issued in a standard CD jewelcase. The 2009 re-release came in a slider box.

Track listing

Certifications

External links
 Album information from cdon
 Maria Mena's Official Website

Maria Mena albums
2002 debut albums